Senator Hazard may refer to:

Rowland G. Hazard (1801–1888), Rhode Island State Senate
Rowland Hazard III (1881–1945), Rhode Island State Senate

See also
David Hazzard (1781–1864), Delaware State Senate